Softly, as I Leave You may refer to:
 Softly, as I Leave You (song), a song composed by Giorgio Calabrese
 Softly, as I Leave You (album), an album by Frank Sinatra